Hauksbee may refer to:
Francis Hauksbee (scientist), 1666–1713.
Mrs. Hauksbee, a fictional character in many stories by Rudyard Kipling